is a district of Shibuya, Tokyo, Japan.

As of October 2020, the population of this district is 10,926. The postal code for Nishihara is 151-0066.

Geography
Nishihara borders Honmachi in the north, Hatsudai and Motoyoyogichō to the east, Uehara to the south, Ōyamachō to the southwest, and Hatagaya to the northwest.

Demography

Education
 operates public elementary and junior high schools.

All of Nishihara (1-3 chome) is zoned to Nishihara Elementary School (西原小学校), and Yoyogi Junior High School (代々木中学校).

Schools in Nishihara include:
 Nishihara Elementary School

Transportation
Nearest stations are Yoyogi Uehara and Hatagaya.

Places of Interest
 National Institute of Technology and Evaluation
 Japan International Cooperation Agency (JICA) Tokyo Center
 Yoyogi Ōyama Park
 Yoyogi Nishihara Park
 Shibuya Ward Sports Center

References

Neighborhoods of Tokyo
Districts of Shibuya